Volleyball for both men and women has been played at the Pan American Games since 1955, when the second edition of the multi-sports event was staged in Mexico City, Mexico.

Men's tournament

MVP by edition
1955 – 1999 – Unknown
2003 –  Ernardo Gómez
2007 –  Gilberto Godoy
2011 –  Wilfredo León
2015 –  Facundo Conte
2019 –  Nicolás Bruno

Women's tournament

MVP by edition
1955 – 1999 – Unknown
2003 –  Yudelkys Bautista
2007 –  Nancy Carrillo
2011 –  Yoana Palacio
2015 –  Carli Lloyd
2019 –  Bethania de la Cruz

Medal table

References

 
Volleyball
Pan American Games